Michalis Chatzis (born 4 September 1978) is a Greek former professional footballer who played as a midfielder.

Career
Born in Athens, Chatzis previously played for Egaleo F.C. in the Greek Super League.

References

External links
Profile at Onsports.gr

1978 births
Living people
Apollon Smyrnis F.C. players
Egaleo F.C. players
A.O. Kerkyra players
Kavala F.C. players
Kalamata F.C. players
Ionikos F.C. players
Super League Greece players
Football League (Greece) players
Association football midfielders
Footballers from Athens
Greek footballers